Tulla is a town in County Clare, Ireland.

Tulla may also refer to:

People
 Johann Gottfried Tulla (1770–1828), German engineer who straightened the Rhine
 Tulla Blomberg Ranslet (born 1928), Norwegian painter

Other uses
 Tulla Lower, a barony in County Clare, Ireland
 Tulla Upper, a barony in County Clare, Ireland
 Tulla exonoma, a species of moth in the monotypic genus Tulla
 Loch Tulla in Scotland
 CityLink and Tullamarine Freeway In Melbourne, Victoria